

University presidents

Please see the entity: Presidents of Zhejiang University

Science and technology

Mathematical sciences

 Shing-Tung Yau: Main founder and academic director of the CMS (Aug 2002–present)
 Shiing-Shen Chern: a director of CMS (2002–2004)
 Chen Jiangong: professor 1929–1952; vice-president of Hangzhou University 1958
 Su Buqing: associate professor 1931; professor and head of the Department of Mathematics 1933-; university provost 1948-; dean Sep 1950-52
 M. T. Cheng: lecturer 1943–1946
 Xu-Jia Wang: lecturer, associate professor 1990–1995
 Kefeng Liu: professor, department chair and executive director of CMS 2003–present

Meteorology, geology, geography

 Ren Mei'e: lecturer 1939; professor 1940-52
 Chang Chi-yun: head of the School of Arts 1947; professor of history and geography for 14 years

Physics, material sciences

 Chien-Shiung Wu: assistant 1935–1936
 Tsung-Dao Lee: founder of ZJIMP
 Kan-Chang Wang: professor 1936–1952
 Jin Au Kong: dean 2003–2008
 Liu Chen - professor (2004–) and director (2006–)

Chemical, biological and medical sciences

 Li Shouheng: lecturer, professor, dean, provost
 Tan Jiazhen: professor 1937; head of the School of Sciences 1951
 Bei Shizhang: associate professor and head of the Department of Biology Aug 1930; head of the School of Sciences May 1950
 Tao-Chiuh Hsu: assistant and lecturer 1941–1947
 Yao Zhen: assistant and lecturer 1937–1946
 Lo Tsung-lo: professor 1940–1944
 Ba Denian: head of the School of Medicine 2003–present
 Jiang Ximing: assistant 1936
 Chen Hang: adjacent professor

Engineering

 Li Hsi-mou - Provost, dean of engineering faculty
 Li Enliang - Vice-president, chair of civil engineering

Economic and social sciences

 Wu Dingliang: professor 1945–1952
 He Weifang: dean of law school 2008–present

Humanities and culture
 Jin Yong: professor 1996–1997; Dean of School of Arts 1999–2005; honorary 2007–present
 Liu Yizheng: lecturer 1937–1938
 Sha Menghai: professor

Business and industry
 Zong Qinghou: professor of EMBA
 Lu Guanqiu: professor of EMBA

Academic staff of Zhejiang University
People associated with Zhejiang University
History of Zhejiang University